Soumaila Tassembedo (born 27 November 1983 in Peni-Houet) is a Burkinabé football player who is currently playing for Etoile Filante Ouagadougou.

Career 
Tassembedo played for Etoile Filante Ouagadougou between 2004 joined than to Sheriff Tiraspol, here played between June 2008 than left Moldova after three and a half year. In January 2009 was on trial at Alemannia Aachen, but the transfer failed and he signed for Etoile Filante Ouagadougou.

International career 
Tassembedo was part of the Burkinabé 2002 African Nations Cup team, who finished bottom of group B in the first round of competition, thus failing to secure qualification for the quarter-finals. He also featured at the 2003 FIFA World Youth Championship.

Personal life 
Soumaila's younger brother Jean-Yves plays in Italy for Associazione Sportiva Virtus Malgrate Valmadrera.

References 

1983 births
Burkinabé footballers
Burkinabé expatriate footballers
Burkina Faso international footballers
Étoile Filante de Ouagadougou players
Burkinabé expatriate sportspeople in Moldova
Living people
Expatriate footballers in Moldova
FC Sheriff Tiraspol players
Liga I players
2002 African Cup of Nations players
People from Hauts-Bassins Region
Association football defenders
21st-century Burkinabé people